Barker Passage is a channel through reef about a kilometre south of North Island in the Houtman Abrolhos.

References

North Island (Houtman Abrolhos)
Straits of Australia